Henry Keene may refer to:

 Henry George Keene, a soldier, civil servant, and orientalist
 Henry George Keene (1826–1915), an English historian
 Henry Keene (Oregon politician)
 Henry Keene (architect)